Aslan bey Gardashov Aliagha oglu (1866–1920) was an Azerbaijani statesman who served as Minister of Agriculture in the fourth cabinet of Azerbaijan Democratic Republic, and was member of Parliament of Azerbaijan.

Early years
Gardashov was born in Çökəkoba village of Zaqatala Rayon, Azerbaijan. He studied in Zaqatala uyezd school and graduated from Pedagogical Seminary. Before the February Revolution, he attended the Istanbul University Faculty of Law and was a member of the Transcaucasian Sejm. After the revolution he joined the ranks of Musavat.

Political career
Gardashov was a member of the Azerbaijani National Council on the eve of declaration of independence who voted in favor of establishing an independent republic. After establishment of Azerbaijan Democratic Republic on May 28, 1918, Gardashov was elected to the National Assembly of Azerbaijan from Ahrar Party. When the fourth government under Nasib Yusifbeyli was formed on April 14, 1919, he was appointed Minister of Agriculture of ADR.

After Bolshevik take over of Azerbaijan on April 28, 1920, Gardashov was one of the members of Azerbaijani parliament who voted in favor of giving up the power to Bolsheviks. He was subsequently arrested and executed by Bolsheviks.

See also
Azerbaijani National Council
Cabinets of Azerbaijan Democratic Republic (1918-1920)
Current Cabinet of Azerbaijan Republic

References

1866 births
1920 deaths
People from Zaqatala District
People from Tiflis Governorate
Government ministers of Azerbaijan
Members of the 2nd State Duma of the Russian Empire
Russian Constituent Assembly members
Members of the National Assembly of the Azerbaijan Democratic Republic
Istanbul University alumni
Istanbul University Faculty of Law alumni
Azerbaijani people executed by the Soviet Union
Transcaucasian Teachers Seminary alumni